The Commissioners of the Committee of Public Safety were appointed by the French Committee of Public Safety to oversee the various administrative departments between 1 April 1794 and 1 November 1795.

History

On 12 Germinal year II (1 April 1794) Lazare Carnot proposed suppressing the Executive Council and the six ministers, replacing the ministers with twelve committees reporting to the Committee of Public Safety. The proposal was unanimously adopted by the National Convention.

The commissioners were dismissed when a new set of ministers was named by the French Directory on 3 November 1795.

Committees

Twelve committees were appointed, each composed of two members and one assistant, reporting to the Committee of Public Safety. 
The commissions were:

Civil administration, police and tribunals
Public education
Agriculture and the arts
Commerce and supplies
Public works
Public assistance
Transport, posts and couriers 
Finance
Movement of land armies
Navy and colonies
Armaments, powder and mining
Foreign affairs

Committee members

The committee members, or commissioners, were:

References

Sources

French Revolution
1794 establishments in France
1795 disestablishments in France
1794 events of the French Revolution
1795 events of the French Revolution
Government of France
People on the Committee of Public Safety